Olearia alpicola, commonly known as alpine daisy bush, is a shrub in the family Asteraceae and is found in mountainous terrain in New South Wales and Victoria in Australia. A small shrub with spreading branches and white daisy-like inflorescences.

Description
The branchlets are densely covered with T-shaped hairs. The leaf upper surface is green, smooth and the margin entire. The underside is covered in densely matted short white-grey hairs with a network of veins, ending in either a blunt or pointed apex. The  4-6 overlapping bracts are conical shaped, arranged in rows, edges fringed and sometimes a purplish colour. The floret centre is yellow.

Taxonomy and naming
This species was first formally described in 1860 by Ferdinand von Mueller who gave it the name Eurybia alpicola and published the description in Papers and Proceedings of the Royal Society of Van Diemen's Land. In 1867, George Bentham changed the name to Olearia alpicola. The specific epithet (alpicola) means "dweller in high mountains.

Distribution and habitat
The alpine daisy-bush grows in damp mountainous situations and dry sclerophyll forests of the eastern ranges in Victoria and south of Ebor and to the Warrumbungle Ranges in New South Wales.

References

Flora of New South Wales
alpicola
Flora of Victoria (Australia)
Taxa named by Ferdinand von Mueller
Plants described in 1860